Autoroute 35 (A-35) is an Autoroute in the region of Montérégie, Quebec, Canada. Constructed in the 1960s, the A-35 links Saint-Jean-sur-Richelieu with Montreal via the A-10. The A-35 is also the primary route for traffic between Montreal and Boston, although it ends  short of the U.S. border. An extension of A-35 to meet Interstate 89 at Saint-Armand will complete a nearly  limited-access highway link between Montreal and Boston. It had been scheduled to open in 2017, but construction was on hold and now will be completed up to the Canada-US border by 2023.

Like many Quebec Autoroutes, the A-35 also has a name: Autoroute de la Vallée-des-Forts (Forts Valley Highway). The name refers to a chain of forts built by the French in the Richelieu Valley during the 17th and 18th centuries to defend their colonial settlements from the Iroquois. The A-35 used to be known as Autoroute de la Nouvelle-Angleterre (New England Motorway), referring to its role as a link between Quebec and New England.

History
By 1966,  connecting the A-10 in Chambly with Route 104 in Iberville were opened to traffic. Another  of A-35 from Route 104 to its terminus with Route 133 were completed in 1967. Completion of the entire length of A-35 had been scheduled for that year in time for Expo 67, but the province instead focused on expediting construction of autoroutes and approach roads to the Expo site. 

For many years, the A-35 featured at-grade intersections with St-Raphael Road and St-Andre Road in Saint-Luc. These intersections were closed in 1999; the St-Andre Road intersection was converted into a partial cloverleaf interchange, while St-Raphael Road was dead-ended on either side of the A-35.

Future
A federal-provincial funding agreement is providing for the completion of the A-35 to Interstate 89 at the U.S. border. The project's objectives are to improve economic links between Quebec and New England, reduce traffic on Route 133 (which is ill-equipped for the traffic it currently carries) and improve quality of life in the region.

Construction of the A-35 extension began in 2009 between Saint-Alexandre and Saint-Sébastien. Construction of the  extension is divided into four segments. The first section (first two segments) of new highway between Saint-Jean-sur-Richelieu and Highway 133 to Saint-Sébastien was opened on October 8, 2014.  

On June 10, 2019, Federal and provincial government officials announced plans to extend Quebec's Highway 35 by nearly nine kilometres in the southbound direction —  leaving it 4.5 kilometres short of reaching the U.S. border.  Although Provincial authorities still did not set  a date when the section would be complete, construction of this section began in 2020.

The Legault government confirmed that Autoroute 35 in the Montérégie region will be completed up to the Canada-US border by 2023.

Phase III of the work aims to extend Highway 35 from Route 133 in Saint-Sébastien to the junction of Route 133 and chemin Champlain and du Moulin in Saint-Armand.  An overpass has been built over Route 202 at Pike River, a bridge is being built over the Rivière-aux-Brochets, an interchange will be erected at the junction of Highway 35, Champlain Road and Route 133 at Saint-Armand and a roundabout will be built just to the northeast of that, at the intersection of Route 133 and Champlain and Moulin roads in Saint-Armand.

Phase IV will complete the last 4.5km of the project between the intersection of Route 133 and Champlain and du Moulin Roads in Saint-Armand to the U.S. border.

In addition, the interchange in Saint-Alexandre that was not built as part of Phase II of the extension, which had been planned for the location where Highway 227 crosses Highway 35 on Rang des Dussault, will be moved to the southeast to meet a re-routed Highway 227 that continues southwest from its current intersection at Rang des Soixante and Chemin de la Grande Ligne.

Exit list

References

External links

A-35 at Quebec Autoroutes
Vallee des Forts Autoroute (A-35) at Steve Anderson's montrealroads.com
Autoroute de la Vallée-des-Forts (35) - Prolongement(MTQ / Transports Québec) 
New exit numbers for Autoroute 35 
Map of the Phase III extension 

Proposed roads in Canada
35
Transport in Saint-Jean-sur-Richelieu